The 19th Game Developers Choice Awards is an annual awards ceremony by Game Developers Choice Awards held at the Game Developers Conference, for outstanding game developers and video games. It was hosted by Tim Schafer.

American video game director, Amy Hennig (Naughty Dog) received the Lifetime Achievement Award.Rieko Kodama received the Pioneer Award for her contributions during her time with Sega and video games such as Alex Kidd, Phantasy Star and Sonic the Hedgehog.

Winners and Nominees

Game of the Year
God of War (Santa Monica Studio/Sony Interactive Entertainment)
Celeste (Matt Makes Games)
Red Dead Redemption 2 (Rockstar Games)
Return of the Obra Dinn (3909 LLC)
Spider-Man (Insomniac Games)

Best Audio
Celeste (Matt Makes Games)
Red Dead Redemption 2 (Rockstar Games)
God of War (Santa Monica Studio/Sony Interactive Entertainment)
Spider-Man (Insomniac Games)
Tetris Effect (Monstars/Resonair)

Best Debut Developer
Mountains (Florence)
Polyarc (Moss)
Nomada Studio (Gris)
Villa Gorilla (Yoku's Island Express)
Sabotage Studio (The Messenger)

Best Design
Into the Breach (Subset Games)
Spider-Man (Insomniac Games)
Celeste (Matt Makes Games)
Red Dead Redemption 2 (Rockstar Games)
God of War (Santa Monica Studio/Sony Interactive Entertainment)

Best Mobile Game
Florence (Mountains)
Alto's Odyssey (Team Alto)
Reigns: Game of Thrones (Nerial)
Holedown (Grapefrukt Games)
Donut County (Annapurna Interactive)

Innovation Award
Nintendo Labo (Nintendo)
Red Dead Redemption 2 (Rockstar Games)
Florence (Mountains)
Tetris Effect (Monstars/Resonair)
Return of the Obra Dinn (3909 LLC)

Best Narrative
Return of the Obra Dinn (3909 LLC)
Florence (Mountains)
God of War (Santa Monica Studio/Sony Interactive Entertainment)
Spider-Man (Insomniac Games)
Red Dead Redemption 2 (Rockstar Games)

Best Technology
Red Dead Redemption 2 (Rockstar Games)
Spider-Man (Insomniac Games)
Assassin's Creed Odyssey (Ubisoft)
Forza Horizon 4 (Turn 10 Studios/Playground Games)
God of War (Santa Monica Studio/Sony Interactive Entertainment)

Best Visual Art
Gris (Nomada Studios)
Spider-Man (Insomniac Games)
God of War (Santa Monica Studio/Sony Interactive Entertainment)
Return of the Obra Dinn (3909 LLC)
Red Dead Redemption 2 (Rockstar Games)

Best Virtual Reality Game
Beat Saber (Beat Games)
Budget Cuts (Neat Corporation)
Tetris Effect (Monstar/Resonair)
Moss (Polyarc)
Astro Bot Rescue Mission (Japan Studio/Sony Interactive Entertainment)

Audience Award
Beat Saber (Beat Games)

Pioneer Award
Rieko Kodama

Lifetime Achievement Award
Amy Hennig

External links
Official website

References

2019 awards
2019 awards in the United States
March 2019 events in the United States
2019 in video gaming
2018 video game awards
Game Developers Choice Awards ceremonies